Aleksander Janson (also Aleksander Alumäe; 15 May 1881 – 26 June 1939 Tartu) was an Estonian politician. He was a member of Estonian Constituent Assembly. He was a member of the assembly since 10 October 1919. He replaced Andres Loorits.

References

1881 births
1939 deaths
Estonian Socialist Revolutionary Party politicians
Estonian Independent Socialist Workers' Party politicians
Workers' United Front politicians
Members of the Estonian Constituent Assembly
Members of the Riigikogu, 1923–1926